Samson Threatening His Father-In-Law is a 1635 oil-on-canvas painting by Rembrandt, now in the Gemäldegalerie, Berlin. It depicts the Biblical story of Samson, who has returned home after an absence to find that his father-in-law has given away Samson's Philistine wife to another man. Samson's reaction was to set fire to the crops in the Philistines' fields.

The painting's narrative subject is "virtually without precedent in Dutch art" according to art historian Gary Schwartz, who says that the painting may have been commissioned by Frederick William, Elector of Brandenburg, and that the bellicose subject may allude to a contemporary event: the fighting in Kleve between Spain and the Dutch Republic during the Eighty Years' War.

Sources

http://www.bildindex.de/dokumente/html/obj02552488

1635 paintings
Paintings by Rembrandt
Paintings depicting Samson
Paintings in the Gemäldegalerie, Berlin